The Kills are an Anglo-American indie rock band formed by American vocalist Alison "VV" Mosshart and British guitarist Jamie "Hotel" Hince.  Since 2002, The Kills have released five studio albums, four extended plays, nineteen singles, sixteen music videos, a documentary, and have contributed original material to two compilations.  The Kills debuted in 2002 with the Black Rooster EP, released on Domino Records.  The duo's debut full-length album, Keep on Your Mean Side, was released the following year.  The album peaked at number 47 on the United Kingdom Albums Chart, while the single "Fried my Little Brains" peaked at number 55 on the UK Singles Chart.  The Kills followed up with No Wow in 2005 and Midnight Boom in 2008, both of which were also released on Domino.  No Wow was the first of the group's releases to chart in the United States, peaking at number 18 on the Billboard "Top Heatseekers" chart.  No Wow also charted in the UK, Belgium, France, and the Netherlands. The group's third album, Midnight Boom charted in a total of nine countries, including the album's first appearance on the Billboard 200 at number 133. Between The Kills' 16 singles, five have charted in the United Kingdom. A tour documentary titled I Hate the Way You Love was included with a limited number of copies of No Wow.

Studio albums

Live albums

Extended plays

Singles

Notes

Music videos

Original contributions to compilations

 A Credited as "VV and Hotel"

References

External links
Official The Kills website

 
 
Discographies of British artists
Discographies of American artists
Kills, The